Inanidrilus carterensis is a species of annelid worm. It is known from subtidal coral sands from the Carter Reef, near the Lizard Island in the northern part of the Great Barrier Reef. It is a very small species: the holotype measures .

References

carterensis
Fauna of the Pacific Ocean
Animals described in 1984
Taxa named by Christer Erséus